Nii Boi Town is a town in the Accra Metropolitan district, a district of the Greater Accra Region of Ghana.

The Major Language spoken in Nii Boi Town is Twi which is also the local language of the Greater Accra Region of Ghana.

References

Populated places in the Greater Accra Region